is a Japanese manga series written and illustrated by Hiroyuki Takei. It was serialized in Kodansha's Shōnen Magazine Edge from September 2015 to April 2018.

Plot 
Set in an alternative version of Feudal Japan inhabited by anthropomorphic Persian cats. Norachiyo's bell hangs from his katana sheath, but he is nonetheless a stray—a rōnin, as he travels across a dishonest world, cutting through pretense and deception with his blade.

Publication
Nekogahara: Stray Cat Samurai is written and illustrated by Hiroyuki Takei. The series was published in Kodansha's Shōnen Magazine Edge from September 17, 2015 to April 17, 2018.

In North America, Kodansha USA announced the English release of the manga in March 2016.

Volume list

References

Further reading

External links
  
 

Comics about cats
Hiroyuki Takei
Historical anime and manga
Kodansha manga
Samurai in anime and manga
Shōnen manga